The Toyota Sienna is a minivan manufactured and marketed by Toyota primarily for the North American market. It is named for the Italian city of Siena, in the region of Tuscany. It replaced the first generation Previa van in 1997 with a more conventional front-wheel drive layout and shares a heavily revised platform with the Camry. Both the Previa and original Sienna were smaller than the other minivans they competed against, but a redesign in 2003 (for the 2004 model year) increased the dimensions to match those of its competitors.

It was redesigned again in 2010 (for the 2011 model year). The third generation Sienna went on sale in the United States in February 2010 and is the first Sienna to ever receive a "Top Safety Pick" award from the Insurance Institute for Highway Safety. A 2020 redesign (for the 2021 model year) saw the Sienna becoming a hybrid vehicle for its fourth generation. While previous generations of the Sienna were exported to select Asian and European markets, the fourth generation is the first to be produced outside of the United States as Chinese production commenced in July 2021 by two Toyota joint ventures. In China, it is also marketed as the Toyota Granvia.

Following the discontinuation of General Motors's all-wheel drive minivans in 2006, the Sienna was the only minivan in its class offered with AWD in North America until the 2021 Chrysler Pacifica was introduced with an AWD option in 2020.

The Sienna is not available in Japan and Australia as it is not produced in a right-hand drive configuration, and the segment in these countries is already occupied by the Alphard/Vellfire and the HiAce/Granvia respectively.



First generation (XL10; 1997) 

In 1997, Toyota launched the front-wheel drive 1998 model year Sienna in the North American market as a replacement for the mid-engined, rear-wheel-drive Previa. Built on an extended platform of the Toyota Camry, the Sienna was appropriately marketed as the "Camry of minivans," capitalizing on the Camry's popularity and reputation.

It came in three trim levels, CE, LE, and XLE. The LE and XLE models were equipped with 2nd row captain's chairs while the CE models came equipped with a 2nd row 2-passenger bench seat. The seats can be easily folded and individually removed as needed. The driver side sliding door and roof rack were standard on the LE and XLE models, but were optional on the CE models. The XLE models offered leather seats and a wood trim package. The Sienna also touted best-in-class fuel economy of  city driving and  highway driving. It was built in Georgetown, Kentucky. A year after its release, the Sienna faced new competition from the redesigned Honda Odyssey minivan, which was larger and now offered a V6 like the Sienna.

In 2000, for the 2001 model year, the Sienna underwent a mid-cycle refresh. This update included a facelift to both front and rear fascias which added a redesigned front grille and bumper along with revised rear tail lights sporting a more modern appearance (clear-lens turn-signals as opposed to amber-coloured). Toyota also revamped the center console area to add more usability to the HVAC controls along with new locations for the accessory switches (rear vent, power sliding doors, heated seats). The driver side sliding door became standard on all models, although the roof rack remained optional on the CE models.

This generation was noteworthy for its impressive safety content as one of the few minivans at the time to offer options including front seat-mounted side torso airbags and Vehicle Stability Control. Anti-lock braking was standard. The Insurance Institute for Highway Safety rated the Sienna "Good" in all six frontal crash test measures, which was far better than the Previa.

The reputation of this generation was marred by a class-action settlement for an engine oil sludge problem which affected the V6 engines in many Toyota models. Symptoms of the problem include oil smoke in the exhaust, oil quickly becoming dark or black after an oil change, gasoline odor in the oil, high oil consumption, and eventually engine failure.

Safety

Second generation (XL20; 2003) 

On 6 January 2003, the second-generation Sienna was unveiled at the North American International Auto Show in Detroit. Production was moved from the Georgetown plant to Toyota Motor Manufacturing Indiana.

Toyota assigned Yuji Yokoya as chief engineer on the new Sienna project. Yokoya and his family drove the previous model over  throughout North America to find weaknesses from the design.

Changes from the first generation included 45% more volume overall and 39% more cargo space. The seats were in the 60/40 split configuration, and the flat-folding third row seat was offered even with all-wheel-drive. The engine was an updated ULEV certified 3.3-liter 3MZ-FE V6 paired with a new five-speed automatic transmission. The gear stick was moved from the steering column to the center console and had a gated shift pattern. Seating for eight was optional on lower-level trims, and the third row seating was fold-flat, allowing the van to transport  building materials like plywood and drywall sheets.

Trim levels, in order of increasing standard and available features were: CE, LE, XLE and XLE Limited (renamed Limited in later years). The most distinguishable difference on the XLE Limited model was the horizontal chrome bar placed above the rear license plate. The CE had a black trim there, while the LE and XLE had a body-colored trim.

Standard features included remote keyless entry, tilt-and-telescopic steering wheel, and high solar energy-absorbing glass (HSEA) on the windshield and front windows. All 2004–2007 Siennas had a factory tow package (hitch kit and trailer lighting connections not included) and a  towing capacity.

All-wheel drive, optional on the more expensive trims included run-flat tires. The all-wheel drive system continuously divided engine power 50:50 front and rear.

Options, depending on the trim level, included HID Xenon headlamps, Dynamic Laser Cruise Control, parking sensors, a convex rear view mirror to enable the driver to see the passengers, a voice-activated navigation system (not voice activated for the 2004/2005 model year) which included a backup camera, 10-speaker JBL audio and rear-seat DVD entertainment system with two 110 V outlets.

EPA Fuel economy was 17 mpg city driving and 23 mpg highway for the FWD version. The AWD version got 16 mpg city driving and 22 mpg highway driving.

Safety 
The Sienna came standard with anti-lock braking system, brake assist, electronic brakeforce distribution, traction control and a tire-pressure monitoring system. Side torso airbags and side curtain airbags were standard on certain 2004 and 2005 LE and XLE trims while optional on others, but became standard on all 2006 trims. Vehicle Stability Control initially optional on lower trims became standard for 2008 models.

The IIHS gives the Sienna an overall "Good" score in their frontal offset crash test with "Good" marks in all six measured categories. All 2006 models and later receive a "Good" overall score, while pre-2006 models without side airbags receive an "Acceptable" score for side impacts.

Model year changes 

 2006: the front fascia, side molding, headlamps and tail lights were restyled. Blue-backlit electroluminescent Optitron gauges were added to LE, XLE, and Limited trims. The "XLE" prefix in "XLE Limited" was removed, and new exclusive equipment for this trim included an optional memory function for the driver's power seat and side-view mirrors (also available on XLE as an option) and power-folding exterior side-view mirrors with integrated in-glass LED turn-signal repeaters. Other options included Bluetooth and a power-folding third-row seat. Front row side torso airbags and side curtain airbags for all three rows became standard equipment on all models. The optional rear seat audio system was discontinued.
This engine had a lower-maintenance timing chain as opposed to the timing belt of previous Sienna engines. The tire pressure monitor was upgraded, and a new seven-spoke alloy wheel design was made exclusive to the Limited and AWD models. 
 2008: Vehicle Stability Control became standard in all trims.
 2009: the Sienna remained largely unchanged, except for a revision in pricing to become more competitive through several available comprehensively equipped "extra-value package" offerings. In Canada, base prices were lowered by up to $1,500. Rear power window switches were also modified to comply with new regulations against toggle window switches.
 2010: the second generation Sienna was unchanged in its final model year.

Third generation (XL30; 2010) 

The redesigned Sienna premiered at the Los Angeles Auto Show in early December 2009 for the 2011 model year. It was designed at Calty studios and engineered at Toyota Technical Center in Ann Arbor, Michigan and Toyota Motor Corporation in Japan. The new Sienna arrived at dealers in February 2010. In November 2011, exports of the XL30 Sienna to South Korea began, making it the first Toyota minivan sold in the country. In July 2016, the Sienna was officially introduced to the Taiwanese market.

In the U.S., the third-generation Sienna was is offered in five trim levels, a base grade, LE, XLE, Limited and for the first time the SE trim. The new SE offers revised bodywork, clear tail lamps,  wheels, firmer suspension and revised steering tuning for a sportier ride. All-wheel-drive is only available with the V6 engine on the LE, XLE and Limited model trims. Described by AOL Autos as slipping a sports car in a minivan, chief engineer Kazuo Mori (an avid autocrosser) reportedly had to overcome opposition to get the SE equipment package included in the line-up.

The previous 3.5-liter 2GR-FE continues, now coupled to a six-speed transmission, but for the first time the Sienna offers a four-cylinder engine, the 1AR-FE. This is the first time Toyota has offered a four-cylinder engine in a North American minivan since discontinuation of the Estima/Previa in late 1997. An electric power steering (EPS) system replaces the previous hydraulic power steering system. Toyota continued to offer all-wheel drive in the Sienna. As GM discontinued its AWD minivans after the 2006 model year, it was the only North American minivan with an available AWD drivetrain until the 2021 Chrysler Pacifica went on sale in late 2020. Toyota published EPA-estimated mileage figures of  city /  highway for models powered by the 4-cylinder engine,  city /  highway for 2WD V6 models, and  city /  highway for AWD models. An optional tow package for V6 models is rated to tow .

The front dashboard features a "swoop" wood trim, inspired by the Toyota Venza and Lexus RX, that gives front seat occupants a "60/60" split whether in the driver or passenger seat.

New features included an optional sliding second row with "Lounge Seating" recliner style chairs, a feature previously seen on the Lexus LS, and Toyota's keyless Smart Key System with push-button start. The rear seat entertainment option now uses a  LCD screen which operates in two view modes, a single 16:9-ratio widescreen or two separate 4:3-ratio split screens with separate wireless headphones.

For safety the back-up camera comes with a new 180° panoramic view. Other new options include a Pre-Collision System (PCS) as well as an automatic highbeam dimmer, Safety Connect and a more advanced stability control system known as Vehicle Integrated Dynamics Management. A driver's knee airbag is now standard as well.

When the second row seats are removed, the bottom of the second row seats, which is similar to a rack, remains attached to the van floor. This means that with second row seats removed, the floor is not flat.

Toyota is the first automaker to offer a factory installed auto-access seat for disabled people. The one-touch rotating, power ascending/descending lift-up seat can lower to within  of the ground.

Yearly changes 
 2011, for the 2012 model year: Toyota's new navigation system with Entune connected navigation system became available.
 2012, for the 2013 model year: The four-cylinder engine was dropped.
 2013, for the 2014 model year: The Sienna remained unchanged.
 2014, for the 2015 model year: Minor refresh with new tail lights for all trim levels except the SE. In the interior, the dash was redesigned replacing the asymmetric swoop with a more conventional and cohesive center display. The previous small info window on top of the dash was also removed and placed in the center display. The center console was also redesigned. The entertainment system was updated to Blu-Ray with HDMI and SD card auxiliary input, from the earlier DVD with RCA jacks. Several technological upgrades could be optioned. Toyota added three new colors (Sky Blue Pearl, Creme Brulee Metallic, and Attitude Black Metallic). For the Limited and SE models, the Sienna features refreshed headlights with LED daytime running lights.
 2016, for the 2017 model year: The six-speed automatic transmission was replaced with an eight-speed and a revised 2GR-FKS engine adding Toyota's D4-S direct injection fuel system.
 2017, for the 2018 model year: A mild facelift with a new front grille, new headlights, new side skirts, standard Safety Sense, minor noise and vibration enhancements, and additional technology like extra USB ports, an updated rear entertainment system (for models equipped with this option), and a semi-digital instrument cluster. The new grille is available in 3 styles: On the XLE and Limited, a chrome pair of wings bisects the grille. On the LE, the wing is black. The SE grille has no wing. The 2018 model year has standard automatic emergency braking, adaptive cruise control, lane-departure warning with lane-keeping assist, and automated high-beams.
 2018, for the 2019 model year: All-wheel drive became available on the SE trim and the Limited trim with FWD is no longer offered. CarPlay support is introduced alongside the Entune 3.0 media system.
 2019, for the 2020 model year: The Nightshade Edition became available on all FWD and AWD models. The Nightshade package includes four exterior colors: Midnight Black Metallic, Celestial Silver Metallic, Salsa Red Pearl and Super White.

Safety 

*vehicle structure rated 'Poor'

Fourth generation (XL40; 2020) 

Toyota announced the fourth-generation Sienna in May 2020 as a 2021 model, and appearing for sale near the end of 2020. It was originally intended to be revealed at the 2020 New York International Auto Show in April, but instead was unveiled virtually on 18 May 2020 due to the COVID-19 pandemic. It was released on 27 October 2020 and hit the showrooms shortly after in November. It is built on GA-K platform. In a significant change, all grades of the Sienna came standard with a hybrid powertrain. Despite being hybrid only, Toyota claims that the fourth-generation Sienna can still tow the same  capacity as the third-generation model.

The fourth-generation Sienna is offered in the returning LE, XLE and Limited trims, while receiving two additional trims: the sport-oriented XSE (replaced the SE trim), and the top-of-the-line Platinum trim. The Sienna is available with a built-in vacuum cleaner, refrigerated compartment (however, vacuum and refrigerator were later discontinued due to supplier issues), heads-up display, and 360° camera view on the Platinum trim level. In addition, the Sienna can be equipped with a third electric motor to power the rear wheels. Standard and optional family oriented features for the Sienna include 18 cup holders, 7 USB ports (only one of which is data capable), four-zone climate control, onboard Wi-Fi, rear entertainment system, power sliding doors and liftgate, and a voice amplification system for the driver for better communications with passengers seated in the back. Standard driver-assistance features include adaptive cruise control, blind-spot monitoring, automated emergency braking, and lane-keeping assist.

Starting in early 2021, the Sienna became available in Taiwan and in Mexico. In July 2021, the Sienna was launched in China where it is locally produced by GAC Toyota, while a rebadged variant bearing the Toyota Granvia nameplate was produced by FAW Toyota. The Granvia adopted the styling of the North American Sienna XSE.

Yearly changes 
 2021, for the 2022 model year: The Woodland Edition was launched, with standard AWD, raised suspension, and tow package. It is built on the XLE trim.

 2022, for the 2023 model year: The Sienna 25th Anniversary was introduced as a limited model with 2,525 units produced, featuring exclusive exterior and interior trim. It is based on the XSE trim.

Safety

Sales

Awards 
2004:
 Car and Driver's Five Best Trucks Van Award
 Edmunds Editor's Most Wanted Van
 Edmunds Consumers' Most Wanted
2010:
 Best Resale Value Award
 Insurance Institute for Highway Safety's "Top Safety Pick" Award (2011 model year only)
2019:

 Longest-Kept Minivan

References

External links 

 

Sienna
Cars introduced in 1997
2000s cars
2010s cars
2020s cars
Minivans
Front-wheel-drive vehicles
All-wheel-drive vehicles
Vehicles with CVT transmission
Hybrid minivans
Partial zero-emissions vehicles
Motor vehicles manufactured in the United States